The Butler County Banner, also known as the Green River Republican, is a weekly newspaper based in Morgantown, Kentucky, and serving Butler County in west-central Kentucky, including Morgantown, Aberdeen, Jetson, Dunbar, Huntsville, Sugar Grove, Brooklyn, Quality, Roundhill, Rochester, and Woodbury. It is a once-a-week newspaper that publishes on Wednesdays, and it is owned by and the flagship weekly newspaper of Jobe Publishing, Inc. based in Horse Cave, Kentucky.

This newspaper is part of Jobe Publishing's news and advertising network that also serves Allen, Barren, Cumberland, Edmonson, Hart, Metcalfe, Russell, and Monroe Counties in Kentucky in addition to Butler County, meaning that Jobe also publishes the Barren County Progress, Cumberland County News, Edmonson News, The Herald-News of Metcalfe County, Monroe County Citizen, The Times Journal, The Citizen-Times and the Hart County News-Herald. All of Jobe's newspapers, including the Banner, are members of the Kentucky Press Association.

History
The first ever edition of the Banner was published in 1885.

Jobe Publishing acquired the Banner-Republican in February 1998. This purchase also marked Jobe's debut as a newspaper publisher. In the 2000s, the Green River Republican merged with the Butler County Banner, and it was consolidated as the once-a-week Butler County Banner-Republican.

Newspaper staff
Newspaper staff as of March 2019
Lynzie Embry-Jones Managing Editor

References

External links
Jobe Publishing, Inc. Official website
Butler County Banner/Green River Republican on Facebook

Butler County, Kentucky
Newspapers published in Kentucky
Publications established in 1885
Morgantown, Kentucky